The 2017 Icelandic Indoor Athletics Championships was the year's national indoor track and field championships for Iceland. It was held from 18–19 February at Laugardalshöll in Reykjavík. A total of 26 national championship events (divided evenly between the sexes) were held. It served as the selection meeting for Iceland at the 2017 European Athletics Indoor Championships.

Results

Men

Women

References

MÍ, aðalhluti Reykjavík - 18.02.17 og 19.02.17 . Afrek.fri. Retrieved 2019-07-14.
MÍ, aðalhluti - 18.2.2017 - Reykjavík . Mótaforrit Frjálsíþróttasambands Íslands. Retrieved 2019-07-14.

External links
 Icelandic Athletics Federation website 

Icelandic Indoor Athletics Championships
Icelandic Indoor Athletics Championships
Icelandic Indoor Athletics Championships
Icelandic Indoor Athletics Championships
Sports competitions in Reykjavík